Felicjanów  is a village in the administrative district of Gmina Bodzanów, within Płock County, Masovian Voivodeship, in east-central Poland. Founded as a Mariavite colony, it currently serves as headquarters of Catholic Mariavite Church.

References

Villages in Płock County